Leopold Stein (3 November 1810 – 2 December 1882) was a German rabbi, theologian, and writer. He was a prominent leader of the Reform movement.

Biography
Leopold Stein was born in Burgpreppach, Bavaria, on 3 November 1810. At the age of five he came to Adelsdorf, where his father was appointed rabbi.

After finishing his earlier education at Erlangen and Bayreuth, he began attending the University of Würzburg in 1830. He received his rabbinic ordination from the Talmudic College in Fürth, and in 1833 he delivered his first sermon in Frankfurt, in which he advocated for the introduction of reforms.

Two years later, Stein became rabbi of Burg- and Altenkunstadt in Franconia. He was rabbi at Frankfurt from 1844 to 1872, when he withdrew from public life. He presided over the rabbinical convention in Frankfurt in 1845.

Work
Stein translated Biblical and medieval poetry into German and added German texts to traditional melodies of the Hebrew liturgy, which were often included in public services. He also published a number of secular poems and theatrical works.

With S. Süsskind, Stein was editor of Der Israelitische Volkslehrer ('The Israelite Folk Teacher', 1860–69), and edited the year-book Achawa, published by the teacher's association. He was a friend of Friedrich Rückert, to whose year-book he contributed several essays.

One of Stein's most popular writings was Die Schrift des Lebens ('The Scripture of Life'), an exposition of the dogmatics and ethics of Judaism.

Publications

  Poems.
 
 
 
 
 
  A drama in five acts.
 
 
  A drama in five acts (performed in Mannheim).
  A drama in four acts.
  A didactic poem.
 
  On Jewish religious law.
 
 Tag des Herrs. Song composed for the Reform ritual to be sung to the music of Kol Nidre on the eve of the Yom Kippur.

References
 

1810 births
1882 deaths
19th-century German dramatists and playwrights
19th-century German poets
19th-century German rabbis
19th-century German theologians
19th-century German translators
German Jewish theologians
German male dramatists and playwrights
German male poets
German Reform rabbis
Hebrew–German translators
Jewish dramatists and playwrights
Jewish poets
Jewish religious writers
Jewish translators
University of Würzburg alumni